This is a list of islands of the United Arab Emirates.

Das Island
Halat al Bahrani
Jazirat Badiyah
Saadiyat Island
Snoopy Island
Sir Abu Nu’ayr
Qarnain island
Socotra Recently annexed by the United Arab Emirates.
Al Fahid Island
Dalma Island

References

Islands

United Arab Emirates